The 6th Illinois Cavalry Regiment was a cavalry regiment that served in the Union Army during the American Civil War.

Service
The  6th Illinois Volunteer Cavalry was mustered into service at Camp Butler, Illinois, on November 19, 1861. The regiment mustered out on November 20, 1865.

Total strength and casualties
The regiment suffered 5 officers and 60 enlisted men who were killed in action or who died of their wounds  and 8 officers and 328 enlisted men who died of disease, for a total of 401
fatalities.

Personnel
 Major Arno Voss – reassigned to 12th Illinois Cavalry February 1, 1862
 Colonel Thomas H. Cavanaugh – resigned March 28, 1862.
 Colonel Benjamin H. Grierson – promoted to brigadier general June 3, 1863.
 Colonel Matthew H. Starr – died of wounds October 1, 1864.
 Colonel John Lynch – mustered out with the regiment.

See also
 List of Illinois Civil War Units
 Illinois in the American Civil War
 Lizzie Aiken, Civil War Nurse

Notes

References
 The Civil War Archive

Units and formations of the Union Army from Illinois
1861 establishments in Illinois
Military units and formations established in 1861
Military units and formations disestablished in 1865